Nicholas Leke, 4th Earl of Scarsdale (1682? – 17 July 1736) was an English politician and courtier.

Biography 
Leke was the nephew of Robert Leke, 3rd Earl of Scarsdale, succeeding him when Robert died childless in 1707. He was admitted to St John's College, Cambridge in 1699.

Scarsdale was Lord Lieutenant of Derbyshire from 1711 to 1714. In 1724 Leke asked the Warwick architect Francis Smith to transform the ancestral home at Sutton Scarsdale to a Georgian style that would rival houses such as Chatsworth House. Smith employed the best craftspeople including Francesco Vassalli, the Atari brothers and Robert Adam.

The building passed through various owners and was stripped in the 20th century. Three of the panelled rooms are now in an American museum whilst the ruins of the building are still there in 2009 as a monument to their ideas. Leke died unmarried and the earldom became extinct. Although unmarried, he fathered three children by Madame Margaret Seymour of Yaxley. Those children were Nicholas, Seymour, and Margaret.

References

|-

|-

1632 births
1736 deaths
Lord-Lieutenants of Derbyshire
Alumni of St John's College, Cambridge
Earls of Scarsdale